The Route is a Ugandan film directed by Jayant Maru, based on a screenplay he wrote. It is about human trafficking in Uganda.

Cast 
 Sharon Detoro as Samantha
 Thomas Kayondo as Sam
 Edlyn Sabrina as Sabrina
 Felix Bwanika as Mr. Nyobobo
 Bwanika Esther as Mother

Accolades
 Nominated for the Best Feature Film in Uganda's Film Festival (2013)
 Nominated for best Feature Film at the Silicon Valley African Film Festival (2013)
 Nominated for best feature Film at the Manya Human Rights Film Festival (2013)
 Won best feature film at the Nile Diaspora International Film Festival (2013)
 Official Selection at the FESTICAB Burundi Film Festival (2014)
 Nominated for best production in the Diaspora at Kalasha Awards (2014)
 Official Selection at the Herat International Women's Film Festival (2015)
 Won Best East African Feature Film at Mashariki African Film Festival (2015)

References

http://www.monitor.co.ug/artsculture/Entertainment/Film-director-explores-social-themes/-/812796/1920132/-/nbwk31z/-/index.html
http://nollywoodtvonline.blogspot.com/2013/06/interview-with-jayant-maru.html
https://web.archive.org/web/20151007114355/http://www.theinsider.ug/tanzania-bans-uganda-film-over-too-much-sex/
http://english.cntv.cn/2014/05/05/VIDE1399235397335242.shtml#.U3pKWlhiOsQ.twitter

Ugandan drama films
Films shot in Uganda
2013 films